Psammathodoxa is a genus of moths of the family Erebidae. The genus was erected by Harrison Gray Dyar Jr. in 1921.

Species
 Psammathodoxa cochlidioides Dyar, 1921 Texas in the US
 Psammathodoxa natadoides Franclemont, 1985 Costa Rica

References

Hypocalinae
Moth genera